Vorzogory is a rural locality (a selo) in Onezhsky District of the Arkhangelsk Oblast, Russia.

In 2016 Vorzogory was included in The Most Beautiful Villages in Russia.

References 

Rural localities in Onezhsky District
Onezhsky Uyezd
Onezhsky District